The 1992 Embassy World Darts Championship was held from 3–11 January 1992 at the Lakeside Country Club, Frimley Green, Surrey.

With Eric Bristow and defending champion Dennis Priestley both going out in round two, the way was paved for the top two seeds, Phil Taylor and Mike Gregory, to make it to the final – notably, the first final since the inauguration of the World Championship in 1978 that featured neither Bristow nor John Lowe.

In a titanic affair, full of big scores and high checkouts, it went to the final set and a tiebreak, where Gregory missed two chances each at double 8, double top and double 10 for the title. It also made Gregory the first player to miss darts at double to win a world championship and eventually lose; none would match this until Mark McGeeney in 2018.

Taylor took full advantage and sent the match to a sudden-death leg, which he won to take his second World title. Taylor's match-winning average of 97.58 remained a record for a BDO world championship final until the tournament's demise in 2020.

Seeds
  Phil Taylor
  Mike Gregory
  Dennis Priestley
  John Lowe
  Bob Anderson
  Jocky Wilson
  Keith Sullivan
  Eric Bristow

Prize money
The prize fund was £116,400.

Champion: £28,000
Runner-Up: £14,000
Semi-Finalists (2): £7,000
Quarter-Finalists (4): £3,500
Last 16 (8): £2,600
Last 32 (16): £1,600

There was also a 9 Dart Checkout prize of £52,000, along with a High Checkout prize of £1,500.

The Results

References

BDO World Darts Championships
Bdo World Darts Championship, 1992
BDO World Darts Championship